Capitol Hill Citizen is a monthly English-language newspaper established in the United States in 2022. It was founded by longtime consumer advocate Ralph Nader.

History
Capitol Hill Citizen was founded by Ralph Nader in 2022 as a print-only publication due to Nader's belief that "online is a gulag of clutter, diversion, ads, intrusions, and excess abundance". 

The paper is available at a cost of $5 and delivered by USPS mail.

As of January 2023, three issues had been published.

Content
The paper's motto "Democracy Dies in Broad Daylight" is intended as a jab at what Politico's Ian Ward described as the [[The Washington Post|Washington Post'''s]] "self-important motto Democracy Dies in Darkness".

According to Politico, the paper's reporting features the "unapologetic muckraking that first propelled Nader into the national spotlight" while Capital & Main describes its content as a "deeply informed focus on how power corrupts". Articles have included inquiries into Politico and its parent company Axel Springer's relationship with advertisers, reporting on ties between the Congressional Black Caucus and corporate America, a feature on the 2022 workplace death of Caterpillar Inc. employee Steven Dierkes, an interview with The Federalist'''s culture editor Emily Jashinksy, an interview with former United States Assistant Secretary of Defense Chas W. Freeman Jr., an interview with Noam Chomsky, an editorial criticizing Ron DeSantis, a listicle of the "top ten corporate crime books of 2022", and a column on a "dark money operation [that] captures and controls the Supreme Court".

Management
The paper is funded by subscriptions and a subsidy from the Center for the Study of Responsive Law. Its editor is Russell Mokhiber.

See also
News media in the United States

References

English-language newspapers published in North America
Newspapers established in 2022
Ralph Nader
Monthly newspapers
2022 establishments in the United States
Newspapers published in Washington, D.C.